Nene Humphrey (born March 18, 1947) is a New York-based sculptor and installation artist. Her work, focusing on sensory experiences of the world, human psychology and handcraft, has been compared to that of Kiki Smith, Janine Antoni, Petah Coyne, and Louise Bourgeois.  She has lived and worked in New York since 1978.

Education and early work

Humphrey received her M.A. at Goddard College, Boston in 1972 and her M.F.A. at York University, Toronto in 1978. In the 1980s she became known for works made with wax, plaster, wood, and wire armatures. These abstract sculptures alluded to and were directly informed by bodily processes and the human form, “the body’s operating systems, its electrical and mechanical structures.”

Her emphasis on material specificity drew comparisons to postminimal sculptors like Eva Hesse.
  
Like Hesse's anti-forms, Humphrey's sculptures referenced minimalism’s formal severity and also examined it critically. Close observation of these works revealed textures by turns soft and ragged, an effect of eroding the surface and “literally scarring or wounding the form.”
  
As Art in America observed of the work in 1992, “Sterile from a distance, their tactile and organic qualities become evident as one approaches… Paradoxically, this crudeness softens the work’s appearance.”

Her work Breathing Wall for Vesalius (1985–86) was made after a back injury left her incapacitated, resulting in drawing studies and a series of sculptural structures with spine-like columns.

Spoons and A Wild Patience

In the mid 1990s Humphrey made a series of works in collaboration with the artist's mother, a homemaker from whose “unheroic” house-bound labor Humphrey previously “had felt disconnected.”  Accepting an offer of help in her studio during one of her mother's visits, Humphrey was made aware of the relationship between her practice and her training under her mother during childhood. Humphrey's Spoon series developed out of an interest in domestic handcraft, and the connection between imprints left by the body and its reciprocal marks in acts such as sewing, scouring, sweeping and braiding. Later compared to Janine Antoni’s silver spoon casts (Umbilical edition, 2000), the resulting Mother’s Spoon casts (1996) were meditations on the nature of the related gestures of stirring and feeding alongside their sculptural counterparts.

Loculus

Humphrey’s Loculus series (1999–2001) continued the artist’s interest in meditative repetition. The Loculus works involved masses of hand-stitched red discs, affixed to the wall or standing structures by trails of thread. As Ariella Budick noted in Newsday Magazine in 2000, the works had a biological appearance “like an enlargement of clustered cells. (The title refers to the cavities in a plant ovary.)”  These clusters drew comparisons both to the biologic imagery of blood clots and spermazoa, and more figuratively to strategic maps and prom corsages.  Works from Humphrey's Loculus series were shown at Kiang Gallery in Atlanta, Dorsky Gallery in New York, the Islip Art Museum in Islip, NY, and were included in Site and Insight at MoMA PS1 in 2003.

Plain Sense of Things and Circling the Center

Following the death of her husband, Humphrey embarked upon a multidisciplinary project reflecting on the psychological process of mourning, and its physiological index in the mourner's brain. In collaboration with scientists at the New York University LeDoux neuroscience laboratory, where she has been an artist in residence since 2005, Humphrey worked to create visualizations from recorded data of brain activity in the amygdala, the part of the brain where emotions reside. Drawings extrapolated from these images served as the framework for a series of two-dimensional, installation, video and sound works. Its first iteration debuted at Lesley Heller Gallery under the title The Plain Sense of Things. Of the multiple levels of content the exhibition confronted, New York Times critic Holland Cotter wrote, “Order and chaos do battle here; the territory charted is both global… and microscopic.”

In a later installation titled Circling the Center at Savannah College of Art and Design, the drawings were shown alongside a performance overseen by Humphrey and featuring SCAD students, faculty and alumni. “Inspired by Victorian mourning braiding, a 19th century tradition in which loved ones would weave the deceased’s hair into a cherished memento,” performers amassed wire braids which were added to a central structure each day, “to create a multimedia experience devoted to the persistence of memory.”
 Roberto C. Lange contributed a score incorporating chants the weavers used to mark their process, Humphrey's recordings of the brain waves of mice in distress, and ambient sound. Such multimedia collaborations characterize Humphrey's recent work and place the artist in what Cristina Albu referred to as "[...] the role of hidden orchestrator of a drama that transcends individual tragedy." In its most multimedia encompassing incarnation to date, Circling the Center was staged in the round at 3LD Art & Technology Center in New York. A live cello player playing Lange's score and four performers braiding and chanting in four-part harmonies moved through a set of braiding tables and sloping scrims upon which videos were projected. Though all elements adhered to a close choreography, the piece played with time in such a way that Carey Dunne described: "What makes the performance so spellbinding is that, like grief itself, it doesn’t quite feel over even when it’s supposed to be. It sparks an eerie sense that, like something out of a fable, this woman’s process is never-ending."

Grants, institutional residencies, and teaching

Humphrey is the recipient of the Montalvo Artist Fellowship (2012), the Agnes Gund Production Grant for Video (2010), the Brown Foundation Fellowship at the Dora Maar House (2009), the MacDowell Colony Fellowship (2008, 1978), the Smithsonian Institution Artist Research Fellowship (2007), the Anonymous Was a Woman Award (1999), the Rockefeller Foundation Fellowship (1986), and the National Endowment for the Arts Artist Grant (1983). She served as faculty at Parsons School of Art and Design from 1992 to 1998, at New York University in 2005, and at the Vermont Studio Center from 2004 to 2009, and was a visiting artist at Brandeis University in 1999 and 2001. She is currently an artist in residence at the New York University LeDoux Center for Neuroscience.

References

External links
Artist’s website
NYU Center for Neural Science website
Hirshhorn Museum Conversation with Nene Humphrey, Nov 1 2007: Podcast
Artist page at Lesley Heller Gallery

1947 births
Living people
20th-century American sculptors
20th-century American women artists
21st-century American sculptors
21st-century American women artists
American women installation artists
American installation artists
American women sculptors
Sculptors from Wisconsin
Feminist artists
Goddard College alumni
People from Portage, Wisconsin
York University alumni